Aguada is a town and municipality in the Vélez Province of the Santander Department in northeastern Colombia. It borders El Guacamayo in the north, San Benito in the south, Suaita in the east and La Paz in the west.

History 
The area of Aguada before the Spanish conquest was inhabited by the Yarigui people. In early 1537, the difficult expedition into the heart of Colombia led by Gonzalo Jiménez de Quesada passed through Aguada.

Modern Aguada was founded in 1956.

Economy 
Main source of income of Aguada is agriculture with products panela reed, maize, beans, yuca, coffee, peas and arracacha cultivated.

References 

Municipalities of Santander Department